A miner is the principal occupation in mining of mineral resources.

Miner may also refer to:

Biology
 Miner, Australian birds of the genus Manorina in the honeyeater family
 Miner, South American birds of the genus Geositta in the ovenbird family
 Leaf miner, the larva of an insect that lives in and eats the leaf tissue of plants

Places
 Miner, Missouri, a city in Missouri, US
 Miner County, South Dakota, US

Arts and entertainment
 The Miner, a novel by the Japanese author Natsume Sōseki
 The Miner (film), a 2017 film
 Miners (poem), a poem by Wilfred Owen
 The Miner, an abbreviated name for the Arizona Miner

People with the surname
 Cyrus Miner (1827–1899), American politician
 Dorothy Miner (historian) (1904–1973), American art historian
 Dorothy Miner, American lawyer
 Eunice Thomas Miner, executive director of the New York Academy of Sciences
 Harold Miner, American professional basketball player
 Horace Mitchell Miner, American anthropologist
 Jack Miner, Canadian conservationist
 James Harvey Miner (1830–1913), American politician and lawyer in Wisconsin
 Jan Miner, American actress
 Jay Miner, American circuit designer, "father of the Amiga"
 Myrtilla Miner, American educator and abolitionist
 Rachel Miner, American actress
 Robert Graham Miner (1911–1990), American diplomat
 Roger Miner, American federal judge
 Ross Miner (born 1991), American skating coach and figure skater
 S. Isadore Miner (pen name, "Pauline Periwinkle"; 1863–1916), American journalist, poet, teacher, feminist
 Steve Miner, American film and television director
 Zach Miner, American baseball player
 William Henry Miner, American industrialist
 Worthington Miner, American film producer and director

Other uses
 Ballarat Miners, Australian basketball team
 Kongsberg Miners, Norwegian basketball team
 Mining (military), an occupation in tunnel warfare
 UTEP Miners and Lady Miners, the Athletics teams representing the University of Texas at El Paso
 George Miner Elementary School, US
 Miner, an entity that performs cryptocurrency mining, for example bitcoin mining
 Miner, a troop from the mobile games Clash of Clans and Clash Royale

Distinguish from
 Minor (disambiguation)
 Myna, a bird of the starling family (Sturnidae)